Christopher Frederick Tyson (born September 7, 1981), better known as Khrysis, is an American hip hop producer and half of the duo The Away Team.

Khrysis' productions consist of samples of records with intricate melodies and diverse drum beats. He began in his teens, recording tracks from his father's massive jazz and R&B record collection onto tape, and then extracting drum samples to make loops using a dual cassette player. He met rapper Chaundon at NC Central University, who introduced him to 9th Wonder. Later, he began an association with The Justus League. With fellow League member Sean Boog, he formed The Away Team, releasing their debut album National Anthem in May 2005, and the follow-up Training Day, in 2007. The two artists would continue to release music as a group until 2011's Scars & Stripes.

Khrysis was also one of the main in-house producers for the North Carolina rap collective Justus League, alongside 9th Wonder. During his time in the collective, he was also producing for external artists such as Sean Price, Masta Ace and Jean Grae. After the collective disbanded, Khrysis would go on to be an in-house producer for 9th Wonder's Jamla label, being a member of the label's Soul Council production team and producing for Jamla artists such as Rapsody, Heather Victoria, GQ and Reuben Vincent. He would also continue producing outside of the Jamla label, for artists including Smif-N-Wessun, Conway the Machine, Murs and Black Thought. He would also collaborate with rapper Elzhi, forming the group Jericho Jackson and releasing their self-titled debut.

In 2007, Khrysis was chosen by Nike to create the soundtrack to the documentary LACED, celebrating 30 years of Nike's association with basketball.

After a number of instrumental albums and collaborative projects, Khrysis released his debut album The Hour of Khrysis on April 20, 2021. The album featured guest appearances from De La Soul, Busta Rhymes, Pharoahe Monch, Chi-Ali, Evidence and Del the Funky Homosapien.

Discography

Albums 
2012: Funkwhatchuheard
2015: On the Boards Vol. 1
2016: MotherfuNker
2018: Elzhi & Khrysis are Jericho Jackson (with Elzhi as Jericho Jackson)
2021: On the Boards Vol. 2
2021: The Hour of Khrysis

EPs 
2013: Merry Khrysmas

Compilations 
2007: Khrysis on the Boards with the Heat Vol. 1
2008: Khrysis on the Boards with the Heat Vol. 2

Production

References

External links 
Khrysis discography at discogs.com
Khrysis interview, MVRemix
Michael, Jon (2007) "Khrysis – Drop A Gem On Em", SixShot.com

1981 births
American hip hop record producers
North Carolina Central University alumni
Musicians from North Carolina
Living people
Rappers from North Carolina
21st-century American rappers